The Benefits of Vegetarianism (Favāyed-e giyāhkhori), published in 1927, by the Iranian writer Sadegh Hedayat, is considered to be one of the most important and influential works written in Persian about animal rights and vegetarianism. It is the more complete edition of Hedayat's older book on animal rights, titled Men and Animals (Ensan va Heyvan). Some vegan parties in Iran, view Sadegh Hedayat as the father of Iran's modern vegetarianism movement.

References

1913 books
Animal welfare and rights in Iran
Books about animal rights
Books about vegetarianism
Books by Sadegh Hedayat
Vegetarianism in Asia